The 2012 Southeastern Conference football season began on August 30 with South Carolina visiting Vanderbilt, and concluded with the BCS National Championship Game on January 7, 2013.  It was also the first season of play for former Big 12 Conference members Texas A&M and Missouri.  Texas A&M plays in the West Division, while Missouri plays in the East Division, although, geographically, Missouri is one of the conference's westernmost teams.

Preseason
Arkansas head coach Bobby Petrino was fired in early April for lying about his affair with an Arkansas employee after a motorcycle accident that he had on April that left him four broken ribs, a cracked vertebra in his neck and numerous abrasions on his face. In the press conference announcing the termination, Arkansas Athletic Director Jeff Long said, "(Petrino) made the decision to mislead the public, (and it) adversely affected the university and the football program."  In Petrino's place, Assistant Coach Taver Johnson will serve as interim coach through the end of spring practice. After the firing of Bobby Petrino in April 2012, there was considerable media speculation that Smith would return to Arkansas. This was confirmed on April 23 when multiple media outlets reported that Smith had indeed agreed to succeed Petrino. He was introduced as Arkansas' 29th full-time head coach the next day. Smith signed a 10-month contract, leading to speculation that he was only taking the post on an interim basis for the 2012 season. The Razorbacks' formal announcement described him as "head coach", without any qualifiers; however, it also indicated that Smith's hiring would allow Arkansas to hire "a head coach for the future of the program" in a more appropriate timeframe following the 2012 season.

At the end of the 2011 season it was announced that Head Coach Houston Nutt resigned from the position of head coach at Ole Miss. His resignation became official once the season ended.  In his place, Ole Miss hired Arkansas State Head Coach Hugh Freeze.

Preseason All-SEC
2012 Pre-season Coaches All-SEC

Rankings

Regular season

All times Eastern time.  SEC teams in bold.

Rankings reflect that of the AP poll for that week until week eight when the BCS rankings will be used.

Week One 

Texas A&M's matchup with Louisiana Tech University was rescheduled to October 13 by agreement of the schools due to the potential impact of Hurricane Isaac on Shreveport, Louisiana, where the game was to be held.

Players of the week:

Week Two 

Players of the week:

Week Three 

Players of the week:

Week Four 

Players of the week:

Week Five 

Week off: Auburn, Florida, Mississippi State, Vanderbilt.

Players of the week:

Week Six 

Week off: Alabama, Tennessee.

Players of the week:

Week Seven 

Week off: Georgia

Players of the week:

Week Eight 

Week off: Arkansas, Ole Miss, Missouri.

Players of the week:

Week Nine 

Week off: LSU.

Players of the week:

Week Ten 

Week off: South Carolina.

Players of the week:

Week Eleven 

Week off: Kentucky.

Players of the week:

Week Twelve 
{| class="wikitable" style="font-size:95%;"
! Date !! Time !! Visiting team !! Home team !! Site !! Broadcast !! Result !! Attendance !! class="unsortable"|Reference
|- bgcolor=ccffcc
| November 17 || 12:21 pm || Western Carolina || #4 Alabama || Bryant–Denny Stadium • Tuscaloosa, Alabama || SEC Network || W 49–0 || 101,126 || align="center"|
|- bgcolor=
| November 17 || 12:21 pm || Arkansas || Mississippi State || Davis Wade Stadium • Starkville, Mississippi || SEC Network || MSU 45–14|| 54,838 || align="center"|
|- bgcolor=ccffcc
| November 17 || 1:00 pm || Jacksonville State || #6 Florida || Ben Hill Griffin Stadium • Gainesville, Florida || ESPN3 || W 23–0 || 82,691 ||align="center"|
|- bgcolor=ccffcc
| November 17 || 1:00 pm || Wofford || #9 South Carolina || Williams-Brice Stadium • Columbia, South Carolina || ESPN3 || W 24–7 || 79,982 ||align="center"|
|- bgcolor=ccffcc
| November 17 || 1:30 pm || Georgia Southern || #5 Georgia || Sanford Stadium • Athens, Georgia || ESPN3 || W 24–7 || 92,746 || align="center"|
|- bgcolor=cccffcc
| November 17 || 2:00 pm || Alabama A&M || Auburn || Jordan–Hare Stadium • Auburn, Alabama || ESPN3 || W 51–7 || 74,832 || align="center"|
|- bgcolor=
| November 17 || 3:30 pm || Ole Miss || #7 LSU || Tiger Stadium • Baton Rouge, Louisiana || CBS || LSU 41–35 || 92,872  ||align="center"|
|- bgcolor=ccffcc
| November 17  || 3:30 pm || Sam Houston State || #8 Texas A&M || Kyle Field • College Station, Texas || ESPN3 || W 47–28 || 87,101 ||  align="center"|
|- bgcolor=ffcccc
| November 17 || 7:00 pm || Syracuse || Missouri || Faurot Field • Columbia, Missouri || ESPNU || L 27–31 || 63,045 || align="center"|
|- bgcolor=
| November 17 || 7:00 pm || Tennessee || Vanderbilt || Vanderbilt Stadium • Nashville, Tennessee || ESPN2 || Vandy 41–18 || 40,350  ||align="center"|
|- bgcolor=ccffcc
| November 17 || 7:30 pm || Samford || Kentucky || Commonwealth Stadium • Lexington, Kentucky || ESPN3 || W 34–3 || 46,749 ||align="center"|
|}

Players of the week:

 Week Thirteen 

Players of the week:

Week Fourteen/SEC Championship

SEC vs AQ-conference matchups
Rankings from the AP Poll

Bowl games

Nine SEC teams became bowl eligible, and all were selected for post-season competition. SEC teams are bolded.

Awards and honors

National awardsHeisman Trophy: Johnny Manziel, Texas A&M
Archie Griffin Award (MVP): Johnny Manziel, Texas A&M
AP Player of the Year: Johnny Manziel, Texas A&M
Chic Harley Award (Player of the Year): Johnny Manziel, Texas A&M
SN Player of the Year: Johnny Manziel, Texas A&M
Campbell Trophy ("academic Heisman"): Barrett Jones, Alabama
Davey O'Brien Award (quarterback): Johnny Manziel, Texas A&M
Manning Award (quarterback): Johnny Manziel, Texas A&M
Dave Rimington Trophy (center): Barrett Jones, Alabama
Outland Trophy (interior lineman): Luke Joeckel, Texas A&M
Jack Lambert Trophy (linebacker): Jarvis Jones, Georgia
Ted Hendricks Award (defensive end): Jadeveon Clowney, South Carolina
Jim Thorpe Award (defensive back): Johnthan Banks, Mississippi State

Consensus All-AmericansQB – Johnny Manziel, Texas A&M -- CONSENSUS -- (AP, FWAA, TSN, WCFF, CBS, ESPN, Scout, SI)OL – Luke Joeckel, Texas A&M -- UNANIMOUS -- (AFCA, AP, FWAA, TSN, WCFF, CBS, ESPN, PFW, Scout, SI)OL – Barrett Jones, Alabama -- CONSENSUS -- (AP, FWAA, TSN, WCFF, CBS, ESPN, Scout, SI)OL – Chance Warmack, Alabama -- UNANIMOUS -- (AFCA, AP, FWAA, TSN, WCFF, CBS, ESPN, PFW, Scout, SI)DL – Jadeveon Clowney, South Carolina -- UNANIMOUS -- (AFCA, AP, FWAA, TSN, WCFF, CBS, ESPN, PFW, Scout, SI)DL – Damontre Moore, Texas A&M -- CONSENSUS -- (AFCA, FWAA, WCFF, ESPN)LB – Jarvis Jones, Georgia -- UNANIMOUS -- (AFCA, AP, FWAA, TSN, WCFF, CBS, ESPN, PFW, Scout, SI)LB – C. J. Mosley, Alabama -- CONSENSUS -- (AFCA, AP, TSN, WCFF, CBS, Scout, SI)DB – Dee Milliner, Alabama -- UNANIMOUS -- (AFCA, AP, FWAA, TSN, WCFF, CBS, ESPN, PFW, Scout)DB''' – Eric Reid, LSU -- CONSENSUS -- (AFCA, FWAA, ESPN, Scout)

All-SEC Teams
The Southeastern Conference coaches voted for the All-SEC teams after the regular season concluded.  Prior to the 2012 SEC Championship Game the teams were released. Alabama had the most representatives on the 2012 All-SEC Coaches’ Football Team, the league office announced on Tuesday. Alabama had eight total members, including six on the first team. Florida was close behind with seven, while Eastern Division Champion Georgia and Tennessee had six each.

Ten of the 14 SEC schools had a member on the first-team All-SEC squad. Alabama led with six, while Florida had five and Texas A&M with four. LSU, South Carolina and Texas A&M had five total members on the annual list, while Mississippi State was next with four total selections.

Coaches were not permitted to vote for their own players.

NFL Draft

Home attendance

Games played at Arkansas' secondary home stadium War Memorial Stadium, capacity: 54,120.

Attendance was 84,644 for the Florida vs. Georgia game in Jacksonville

References